Monckton Athletics Football Club was an English association football club based in South Yorkshire. They won the Sheffield Association League in 1911, and were regular participants in the FA Cup.

Records
 Furthest FA Cup run – 2nd qualifying round, 1930–31, 1945–46

References

Defunct football clubs in South Yorkshire
Defunct football clubs in England
Sheffield Association League
Barnsley Association League
Yorkshire Football League